Vacaville High School is an American public high school in the Vacaville Unified School District located in the city of Vacaville, California, serving the north side of the city and the far northern unincorporated communities of Allendale, Bucktown and Hartley.

History
The original school building was completed in 1898 and was used until 1952, when a new building replaced it. Originally named Vacaville Union High School. In 2018, two fifteen-classroom mathematics and English buildings were opened.

Notable alumni

 Jordan Brown, major league baseball outfielder
 Randy Dedini, professional soccer goalie and college head coach
 Kyle DeVan, played offensive guard for the Indianapolis Colts and other NFL teams
 Tony Gonsolin, Major League Baseball pitcher for the Los Angeles Dodgers, 2020 World Series Champion
 Bob Heise, former Major League Baseball player
 Stefan Janoski, skateboarder with signature Nike shoe 
 Josh Kaddu, NFL linebacker
 Zack Nash, NFL linebacker
 Aaron Pauley, lead vocalist and bassist for the metalcore band Of Mice & Men
 Dave Sells, former Major League Baseball pitcher
 Jacoby Shaddix, leader of the band Papa Roach
 Robyn Stevens (born 1983), race walker
 Mykal Walker, NFL linebacker for the Atlanta Falcons.
 Thomas Williams, NFL linebacker and motivational speaker

Notable staff 
 Raymond C. Carrington, sculptor; math teacher at the school
 Jason Fisk, former professional football player; football coach at the school

References

External links 
 

High schools in Solano County, California
Educational institutions established in 1898
Buildings and structures in Vacaville, California
Vacaville, California
1898 establishments in California